Mary-Kate Olsen and Ashley Fuller Olsen (born June 13, 1986), also known as the Olsen twins as a duo, are American fashion designers and former actresses. The twins made their acting debut as infants playing Michelle Tanner on the television series Full House. At the age of six, Mary-Kate and Ashley began starring together in other TV shows, film, and video projects, which continued to their teenage years. Through their company Dualstar, the Olsens joined the ranks of the wealthiest women in the entertainment industry at a young age.

Lives and career

Childhood and acting career
The twins were born in Sherman Oaks, California, to David "Dave" Olsen and Jarnette "Jarnie" (née Jones). They have an elder brother, Trent, and a younger sister, actress Elizabeth, as well as a half-sister, Courtney Taylor, and a half-brother, Jake. The twins' parents divorced in 1995; Taylor and Jake are from their father's second marriage. The Olsen twins have Norwegian ancestry.

In 1987, at the age of six months, the twins were cast in the role of Michelle Tanner on the ABC sitcom Full House. They began filming at nine months old. In order to comply with child labor laws that set strict limits on how long a child actor may work, the sisters took turns playing the role. The Olsens continued to portray Michelle throughout the show's run, which concluded in 1995.

In 1992, Mary-Kate and Ashley shared the role of Michelle Tanner when they guest-starred on the Full House crossover episode of Hangin' with Mr. Cooper. While starring on Full House, the Olsens also began appearing (as separate characters) in films for video and television. The first such film, To Grandmother's House We Go, debuted in 1992 and featured cameos from several other Full House actors. In 1993, the Olsens established the company Dualstar, which would produce the twins' subsequent films and videos, including 1993's Double, Double, Toil and Trouble and 1994's How the West Was Fun. A series of musical mystery videos called The Adventures of Mary-Kate & Ashley premiered in 1994 and continued through 1997.

In 1995, following the end of Full House, the Olsens made their feature film debut in It Takes Two, co-starring Steve Guttenberg and Kirstie Alley. In the same year, they introduced a second video series, You're Invited to Mary-Kate & Ashley's..., which continued to release new entries until 2000.

The following year, the Olsens appeared in an episode of All My Children. In 1997, they appeared once again as guest stars in an episode of Sister Sister. Also, in 1998, the twins returned to series television with another ABC sitcom, Two of a Kind, co-starring Christopher Sieber as their characters' widowed father. The series lasted only one season but aired in reruns on cable for several years afterward. 1998 also saw the release of Billboard Dad, the first of a new string of direct-to-video films starring the Olsens. The final such film, The Challenge, debuted in 2003.

In 2000, the Olsens appeared in an episode of 7th Heaven as bad girls Sue and Carol Murphy. The following year, the sisters starred in two new series: So Little Time, a live-action sitcom on Fox Family (later ABC Family); and Mary-Kate and Ashley in Action!, an animated series airing Saturday mornings on ABC. Both shows were canceled after one season, although Mary-Kate received a Daytime Emmy Award nomination for her performance on So Little Time.

In early 2004, Mary-Kate and Ashley had a cameo voice role in an episode of The Simpsons as the readers of Marge's book-on-tape, The Harpooned Heart. Also in 2004, the twins starred in a second feature film, New York Minute. It would be their last film together, as well as Ashley's last acting role. Mary-Kate has continued to appear in film and television.

Mary-Kate and Ashley had a fan club until 2000, "Mary-Kate & Ashley's Fun Club", where fans would pay to receive Mary-Kate and Ashley collectibles and photos. Each subscription included an issue of Our Funzine, Mary-Kate and Ashley's fan club magazine, exclusively available through the club, and a collectibles catalog, where one could purchase T-shirts, posters, baseball caps, key rings, school folders, postcards, and various other items. Subscribers would also receive "surprise gifts" (usually key rings, book excerpts, or back issues of the Funzine), lyric sheets to Mary-Kate and Ashley's songs, a school folder, a membership card, a full-sized poster, two black and white photos (one of each girl), and a color photo with reprint autographs. The club was advertised at the beginning of Mary-Kate and Ashley movies until 1998.

Mary-Kate and Ashley were popular figures in the preteen market during the late 1990s and early 2000s. Their names and likenesses extended not only to movies and videos, but to clothes, shoes, purses, hats, books, CDs and cassette tapes, fragrances and makeup, magazines, video and board games, dolls, posters, calendars, and even telephones and CD players—with a market share made up mostly of the tween demographic. Mattel produced various sets of Mary-Kate and Ashley fashion dolls from 2000 to 2005, along with separate outfits and accessory packs.

The sisters became co-presidents of Dualstar on their 18th birthday in 2004. Upon taking control of the company, Mary-Kate and Ashley made moves to secure the future of the company by releasing products that appealed to the teen market, including home decoration and fragrances. The Dualstar brand has been sold in more than 3,000 stores in the United States and over 5,300 stores worldwide. The Olsens have appeared on the Forbes "Celebrity 100" list since 2002; in 2007, Forbes ranked them (collectively) as the eleventh-richest women in entertainment, with an estimated net worth of US$100 million.

Fashion career
As the sisters have matured, they expressed greater interest in their fashion choices, with The New York Times declaring Mary-Kate a fashion icon for pioneering her signature "homeless" look. The style sometimes referred to by fashion journalists as "ashcan" or "bohemian-bourgeois", is similar to the boho-chic style popularized in Britain by Kate Moss and Sienna Miller. The look consists of oversized sunglasses, boots, loose sweaters, and flowing skirts, with an aesthetic of mixing high-end and low-end pieces. The twins were tapped as the faces of upscale fashion line Badgley Mischka in 2006.

The Olsens had a clothing line for girls ages 4–14 in Wal-Mart stores across North America, as well as a beauty line called "Mary-Kate and Ashley: Real fashion for real girls". In 2004, they made news by signing a pledge to allow full maternity leave to all the workers that sew their line of clothing in Bangladesh. The National Labor Committee, which organized the pledge, praised the twins for their commitment to worker rights.

 The Olsens have also launched their own couture fashion label, The Row, named after Savile Row in London. In 2007, they launched Elizabeth & James, a contemporary collection inspired by many of their unique vintage finds and pieces in their personal wardrobes. They have also released a women's clothing line for J.C. Penney, called Olsenboye, and a T-shirt line called "StyleMint". In 2008, the sisters published the book Influence, a compilation of interviews with many of the most prominent people in the field of fashion. In August 2013, the twins launched a new fashion line in Oslo, Norway. The Olsens were first named Womenswear Designer of the Year by the Council of Fashion Designers of America (CFDA) for The Row in 2012. They received the award again in 2015. The CFDA also named the Olsens Accessories Designer of the Year in 2014 for their work with The Row.

Filmography
 This filmography is of the twins as a duo. See Mary-Kate Olsen for other productions in which she has appeared.

Awards and nominations

See also
List of twins

Notes

References

Further reading
Olsen, Mary-Kate and Ashley Olsen, with Damon Romine. Mary-Kate and Ashley: Our Story: Mary-Kate & Ashley Olsen's Official Biography. HarperEntertainment 2000. .
Tracy, Kathleen. Mary-Kate and Ashley Olsen. Mitchell Lane Publishers, 2003. .

External links

 Dualstar Entertainment Group Corporate Website
 
 
 

 
1986 births
Living people
Actresses from California
American child actresses
American film actresses
American television actresses
American women in business
People from Sherman Oaks, Los Angeles
American people of Norwegian descent
American people of English descent
Sibling duos
Olsen family
Twin actresses
American twins
Businesspeople from Los Angeles